Shast Pich, also rendered as Shast Fich may refer to:
 Shast Pich-e Olya
 Shast Pich-e Sofla